József Bencsics (6 August 1933 – 13 July 1995) was a Hungarian footballer who played for Haladás, Újpest FC and Pécsi Dózsa as well as representing the Hungarian national football team at the 1958 FIFA World Cup. He played 8 games and scored 1 goals for the Hungarian national team. Bencsics died in Budapest on 13 July 1995, at the age of 61.

References

1933 births
1995 deaths
1958 FIFA World Cup players
Association football forwards
Hungarian footballers
Hungarian people of Croatian descent
Hungary international footballers
Pécsi MFC players
Szombathelyi Haladás footballers
Újpest FC players
Sportspeople from Szombathely